Micromeria pineolens (tomillo del pinar, tomillón) is an endangered species of flowering plant in the Lamiaceae native to Gran Canaria in the Canary Islands. It is a woody sub-shrub, 30–70 cm in height, with hairy, yellowish-green leaves about 1.5 to 2 cm in length, and pink flowers.

References

 The Plant List entry

pineolens
Flora of the Canary Islands
Plants described in 1960
Endangered plants